Larry Cohen (born 7 November 1987) is a South African professional soccer player of Lithuanian descent who plays for Ajax Cape Town.

Personal 
Larry Cohen was born to Martin Cohen, one of South Africa's prominent footballers in the 1970s.

On 21 November 2014, Cohen's application of the reinstation of the Lithuanian nationality was approved and he became a Lithuanian citizen. He received his first call up for the Lithuanian national football team for the UEFA Euro 2016 qualifying match against England, but FIFA did not allow Cohen to play for Lithuania.

Playing career 
After four seasons with Ezenkosi, Cohen signed with Wits in 2010.

References 

1987 births
Living people
South African soccer players
Jomo Cosmos F.C. players
Jewish footballers
South African Jews
South African people of Lithuanian-Jewish descent
Association football midfielders
Bidvest Wits F.C. players
Mpumalanga Black Aces F.C. players
Soccer players from Johannesburg
Moroka Swallows F.C. players
Association football defenders
Chippa United F.C. players
Jewish South African sportspeople